Siphona singularis is a Neotropical species of tachinid flies in the genus Siphona of the family Tachinidae. It is the type species of the Actinocrocuta subgenus within Siphona.

Distribution
Siphona singularis is distributed widely in the Neotropical realm. It is recorded in Costa Rica, Colombia, Ecuador, Peru, Brazil (Manaus and southeastern region) and Trinidad.

External links

Tachininae
Taxa named by Christian Rudolph Wilhelm Wiedemann
Diptera of North America
Diptera of South America